Tremont Township is located in Tazewell County, Illinois. As of the 2010 census, its population was 2,641 and it contained 1,043 housing units.

History

Tremont gets its name from the Tri-Mounts, the three hills or mountains that border the village. One northeast, one slightly southeast, and one southwest. Hills form the swag in which the city is located. Back when the country was a vast prairie, these hills were much more prominent since the cities were built.
The first white settler near Tremont was a man named Chapman who came here in the early 1820s. He built a cabin near Grove in Pleasant Village, but shortly thereafter he moved to the town of Tremont, two and a half miles east. In 1826, Thomas Briggs and Hezekiah Davis came from Sangamon County and settled 2.5 miles northwest of Pleasant Grove as Native American merchants. They brought barrels of whiskey, calicos, blankets and other trinkets. Men's Wm. Davis, Nathan Dillon and Martin Miars were a few miles east of Tremont at about the same time. In 1830, James Stirling came to Tremont from Sangamon County and settled on a farm now owned by James Cottingham, two miles northeast of the village. Mr. Sterling was the first permanent white settler in his township of Tremont. When he came he had only a horse and a carriage. However, his horse briefly strayed and lost his horse. When the deep snow fell, he and his family saw no one for two months, except for the William Broyhill family, who had come with him. They ate deer meat and corn. They couldn't get flour. Their corn was running low and he walked three miles to the nearest settlement to get more corn to make corn. The winters of 1830 and his 1831 were impressive with deep snow. It started snowing on the night of December 29th and continued for three days and three nights. It averaged about 4 feet deep, but drifted between 18 and 20 feet in places.

Geography

Demographics

References

External links
City-data.com
Illinois State Archives

Townships in Tazewell County, Illinois
Peoria metropolitan area, Illinois
Townships in Illinois